Philip Tiu Tan is a Filipino politician from the province of Misamis Occidental in the Philippines. He is currently serving as the Governor of Misamis Occidental. He was first elected as Governor of the province in 2019.

References

Living people
Nacionalista Party politicians
People from Misamis Occidental
Governors of Misamis Occidental
Year of birth missing (living people)